The 2022 Iași Open was a professional tennis tournament played on clay courts. It was the third edition of the men's tournament which was part of the 2022 ATP Challenger Tour and first edition of the women's tournament which was part of 2022 WTA 125 tournaments. It took place in Iași, Romania between 11 and 17 July 2022 for the men and between 1 and 7 August for the women.

Men's singles main-draw entrants

Seeds

 1 Rankings as of 27 June 2022.

Other entrants
The following players received wildcards into the singles main draw:
  Marius Copil
  Cezar Crețu
  Nicholas David Ionel

The following players received entry into the singles main draw as alternates:
  Filip Cristian Jianu
  Oleksii Krutykh
  Lucas Miedler
  Nikolás Sánchez Izquierdo
  Louis Wessels

The following players received entry from the qualifying draw:
  Joris De Loore
  Nicolae Frunză
  Ștefan Paloși
  José Pereira
  Matheus Pucinelli de Almeida
  Ilya Snițari

The following player received entry as lucky losers:
  Andrey Chepelev
  Oleg Prihodko

Women's singles main-draw entrants

Seeds

 1 Rankings as of 25 July 2022.

Other entrants
The following players received wildcards into the singles main draw:
  Andreea Prisăcariu
  Antonia Ružić
  Oana Georgeta Simion
  Briana Szabó

The following players received entry from the qualifying draw:
  Darya Astakhova
  Cristina Dinu
  Ilona Georgiana Ghioroaie
  Yuki Naito

The following players received entry as lucky losers:
  Lavinia Tănăsie
  Olivia Tjandramulia

Withdrawals 
Before the tournament
  Julia Grabher → replaced by  Nadia Podoroska
  Arianne Hartono → replaced by  Alexandra Cadanțu-Ignatik
  Ylena In-Albon → replaced by  Dea Herdželaš
  Gabriela Lee → replaced by  Lavinia Tănăsie
  Laura Pigossi → replaced by  Olivia Tjandramulia
  Anna Karolína Schmiedlová → replaced by  Despina Papamichail

Women's doubles main-draw entrants

Seeds 

† Rankings are as of 25 July 2022

Other entrants 
The following pair received a wildcard entry into main draw:
  Daria Munteanu /  Catrinel Onciulescu

The following pair received entry using a protected ranking:
  Hsieh Yu-chieh /  Lu Jingjing

Withdrawals
Before the tournament
  Maja Chwalińska /  Jesika Malečková → replaced by  Andreea Prisăcariu /  Anita Wagner
  Anastasia Dețiuc /  Miriam Kolodziejová → replaced by  Anastasia Dețiuc /  Elixane Lechemia
  Elixane Lechemia /  Laura Ioana Paar → replaced by  Paula Ormaechea /  Prarthana Thombare

Champions

Men's singles

 Felipe Meligeni Alves def.  Pablo Andújar 6–3, 4–6, 6–2.

Women's singles

 Ana Bogdan def.  Panna Udvardy 6–2, 3–6, 6–1

Men's doubles

 Geoffrey Blancaneaux /  Renzo Olivo def.  Diego Hidalgo /  Cristian Rodríguez 6–4, 2–6, [10–6].

Women's doubles

 Darya Astakhova /  Andreea Roșca def.  Réka Luca Jani /  Panna Udvardy 7–5, 5–7, [10–7]

References

External links 
 

2022 ATP Challenger Tour
2022 WTA 125 tournaments
2022 in Romanian sport
July 2022 sports events in Romania
August 2022 sports events in Romania